Motides is a small village in Cyprus, to the east of Lapithos. De facto, it is under the control of Northern Cyprus.

According to the Statistics Office of Northern Cyprus, in 2011 there were 180 inhabitants in the village.

References 

Communities in Kyrenia District
Populated places in Girne District